Suzanne Royce (born November 19, 1946) is the former Chief Scrutineer in the United States for FIA Formula 1, FIM MotoGP, Formula E, the FIA World Endurance Championship, and other international motorsports events. She was the first woman to be granted an FIA International Chief Scrutineer License in the world, when she received it in 1986.  While no definitive list exists, it is believed that (through 2020) she was the only woman to have held this role for Formula One.  On November 28, 2020, Royce was honored by the FIA as the Best Chief Scrutineer of the year during its annual Volunteers Weekend recognition.  Royce was recognized by COTA and the FIA on October 24, 2021, at the US Grand Prix as she retired from active involvement with international motorsport.

Royce died on March 5, 2022, due to complications from COVID-19.  She was fully vaccinated, but contracted the virus while in the hospital for routine surgery.

Motorsports career 
Royce emigrated from the United Kingdom to the United States in 1970.  She began her involvement as a scrutineer with the Detroit Region of the Sports Car Club of America in the early 1970's, serving as Chief Scrutineer for her first regional event by 1976.  When Formula 1 came to Detroit in 1982, she volunteered as a member of the scrutineering team.  She quickly took on a leadership role, becoming co-Chief Scrutineer in 1985 and taking over the reins independently in 1986.

She served as the sole Chief Scrutineer for Formula 1 in the United States from 1985 through 2021.  After the United States Grand Prix moved to the Circuit of the Americas (COTA - Austin, TX) in 2012, she was also asked to serve as Chief Scrutineer for other international motorsports events at COTA, Sebring, and various street circuits throughout the US.

  	 	

In 2012, Royce co-authored a book entitled Learn & Compete: A Primer for Formula SAE, Formula Student, and Formula Hybrid Teams. The book provides an introduction to the engineering and team management aspects that students may want to consider as they participate in the Formula SAE, Formula Student, or Formula Hybrid competitions.

References 

1946 births
Living people
English emigrants to the United States
Formula One people
Auto racing people